Jane Maria Strachey, Lady Strachey (13 March 1840 – 14 December 1928) was an English suffragist and writer. Her father was a British colonial administrator and she later married her father's secretary, Sir Richard Strachey, and ten of their children survived into adulthood. She was an outspoken advocate for the right of women to vote and involved her daughters in her campaigning. She wrote two books for children.

Early life

Lady Strachey was born on the ship Earl of Hadwick off the coast of Cape of Good Hope on 13 March 1840. Her father was British Colonial Administrator Sir John Peter Grant, who later served as the Lieutenant-Governor of Bengal and as Governor of Jamaica, and her mother was Henrietta Chichele Plowden. Strachey became the second wife of her father's secretary, Sir Richard Strachey, who was 23 years older than she, in 1859. Sir Richard and Lady Strachey had 13 children, 10 of whom survived into adulthood – Lytton, James, Dorothea, Pernel, Oliver, Marjorie, Dick, Ralph, Philippa and Elinor.

Professional life

Her husband introduced her to the works of John Stuart Mill. They moved to Edinburgh in 1866–1867 and Lady Strachey began gathering signatures for petitioning the Parliament for women's right to vote. Her first article on women's suffrage was published in The Attempt which was published by the Edinburgh Ladies Debating Society. She became a member of the Edinburgh National Society for Women's Suffrage in 1868 but moved to India with her husband who was posted in the British Colonial administration again.

The couple returned to London in 1879 and she restarted her suffrage work. She was an active supporter of the New Hospital for Women, an initiative to provide poor women with medical help from qualified female practitioners. She was also a financial supporter of Girton College, Cambridge. She was an organiser of the Women's Local Government Society and in 1909 became the chair of its London branch. Her work achieved fruition when a WLGS sponsored bill was mentioned in the King's Speech in 1907.

Lady Strachey also published two children's books, in 1887 and 1893. She also wrote Poets on Poets in 1894 besides working on an English translation of Alexander Herzen's De l'autre rive. An account of her and her family is provided in Betty Askwith's Two Victorian Families.

In 1907, Lady Strachey was elected to the Executive committee of the National Union of Women's Suffrage Societies. She and her daughters were also active organisers of the Mud March from Hyde Park to Exeter Hall to demand the right to vote. In 1909 she became an editorial board member of the English Woman's Journal and was elected as the President of the South Paddington Committee of the London Society for Women's Suffrage. Her professional activities declined after her husband's death in 1909. She was offered the directorship of the Society of Women Writers and Journalists in 1920, which she declined. She died in 1928. Virginia Woolf wrote an extensive obituary essay detailing Lady Strachey's contribution to the women's movement.

References

Further reading
 

1840 births
1928 deaths
People born at sea
English suffragists
19th-century British women writers
19th-century British writers
20th-century British women writers
Writers from London
British feminist writers
British feminists
Grant family (Scotland)
Jane Maria
Wives of knights
National Society for Women's Suffrage